Novaya Kara (Yañı Qara) is a rural locality (a village) in Kazanchinsky Selsoviet, Askinsky District, Bashkortostan, Russia. The population was 167 as of 2010. There are 5 streets.

Geography 
Novaya Kara is located 42 km northwest of Askino (the district's administrative centre) by road. Staraya Kara is the nearest rural locality.

References 

Rural localities in Askinsky District